The Unemployment Insurance Act 1920 was an Act of Parliament in the United Kingdom. It created the dole (weekly cash unemployment benefits) system of payments to unemployed workers. The Act passed at a time of very little unemployment, when the Conservatives dominated Parliament. It set up the dole system that provided 15 weeks of unemployment benefits to over 11 million workers—practically the entire civilian working population except domestic service, farm workers, railway workers, and civil servants.  Funded in part by weekly contributions from both employers and employed, it provided weekly payments of 15s for unemployed men and 12s for unemployed women.  Historian Charles Loch Mowat calls this legislation "Socialism by the back door," and notes how surprised politicians were when the costs to the Treasury soared during the high unemployment of 1921.

See also
Unemployment Insurance Act 1921

References

Insurance legislation
United Kingdom Acts of Parliament 1920
1920 in economics
Unemployment in the United Kingdom
Unemployment benefits